Leovan O'Garro (born 26 June 1987) is a Montserratian international footballer who plays for Irish club Foxfield United, as a midfielder.

Career
O'Garro made his international debut for Montserrat on 6 October 2010. He has seven caps to date, including in one FIFA World Cup qualifying match.

References

1987 births
Living people
Montserratian footballers
Montserrat international footballers
Association football midfielders
Expatriate association footballers in Ireland
Montserratian expatriate footballers